"Someone New" is a 2002 single released by Eskobar featuring Heather Nova. The duet was an international hit.

Although both artists are still primarily known in Europe, the popularity of "Someone New" saw Eskobar and Heather Nova's fan base reach America through MTV.

Music video 

The success of the song has been attributed to the "Someone New" music video, which also featured Heather Nova, and made its rounds on the European music television channels.

Charts

Weekly charts

Year-end charts

In the media 
The song was featured in a television commercial for the 3G mobile operator 3, and later in a commercial for Peugeot 208.

References 

2002 singles
2002 songs